Mehmed-beg Kulenović, Gazi Mehmed-beg Kulenović, Mehmed-beg Kulinović, also known as Kulin-kapetan (1776 – 13 August 1806) was a Bosnian Ottoman nobleman born and raised in Kulen Vakuf who later became the Kapetan of Bosnia Eyalet.  He was the seventh captain of the Stara Ostrovica capitancy from the Kulenović lineage, the commander of the Bosnian sipahi cavalry, i.e. the left wing of the army of the Bosnian eyalet in the Battle of Mišar and the hero of several folk songs.

Early life
Mehmed-bey Kulenović was the son of Hadži-Ibrahim-bey Kulenović of Kulen Vakuf, the sixth captain of Stara Ostrovica capitancy. After inheriting his father's titles he became one of the most important military frontier authorities in Bosnia Eyalet, and was referred to by his servicemen as the "Master of Ostrovica". The branch of the Kulenović family, one of the largest Bosniak aristocratic families in general, to which Mehmed-bey belonged, was also engaged in  tax farming (haraç), so it was called Haračlije. Mehmed-bey Kulenović was one of the most active and warlike frontier captains of his time. He took part in the military campaigns of several Bosnian viziers, starting with the one with Beqir-pasha (Abu Bakir-pasha) on Belgrade, with the aim of calming the uprising against the Belgrade dahis (renegade Janissary), then in defending Višegrad and Užice from Serbian insurgents, guarding the borders of the Bosnia Eyalet on the Drina river, leading raids and incursions in Mačva and Pocerina, until the campaign in the summer of 1806 and the Battle of Mišar.

First Serbian Uprising and Battle of Mišar
When the First Serbian Uprising broke out in 1804–05, after the assassination of Hadji Mustafa Pasha of Belgrade, turmoil had become evident throughout the Sanjak of Smederevo; thousands of Muslim refugees from the Sanjak began to pour into the Sanjak of Zvornik. In 1805 the Serbian rebels led by Luka Lazarević had begun their assault on Zvornik itself prompting the Ottoman Grand Vizier to mobilize his army in the Bosnia Eyalet commanded by Sulejman-paša Skopljak and Mehmed-bey Kulenović.

In the Battle of Mišar, Mehmed-bey Kulenović commanded the left wing of the Bosnian Ottoman army, that is cavalry of Bosnian spahis. According to the recorded statements of the participants and the analysis of some Serbian military historians, during the Battle of Mišar, the Serbian insurgents mostly limited themselves to fighting from a fortified trench and rarely dared to sally forth. The Serbian cavalry, which was intended as a reserve and located not far from the trench near the village of Žabar, was quickly defeated by the well-trained and experienced cavalry of the Bosnian spahis, led by Mehmed-bey Kulenović, during the first serious use on Mišar. The fighting lasted for several days with mutual losses. The success of the Serb insurgents consisted in holding on, thus preventing the Bosnian Ottoman army from passing towards besieged Belgrade. On August 13, 1806, leading a renewed cavalry charge on the trench, Mehmed-bey Kulenović was challenged to a duel by Duke Luka Lazarević. Mehmed-bey came out of the duel as the winner, but then he was killed from a pre-set ambush by Serbian insurgents who accompanied Duke Luka Lazarevic. The body of Mehmed-bey Kulenović was transferred to Bosnia and buried in the courtyard of the mosque in Janja, where his turbe is still located. Filip Višnjić sang about Mehmed-bey Kulenović in the songs "Knez Ivan Knežević" and "Boj na Mišaru", taking him as a central figure and the commander-in-chief of the Bosnian eyalet army. Mehmed-bey Kulenović was succeeded as captain of the Stara Ostrovica capitancy by his son Ahmed-bey Kulenović (Kulinović).

References

1776 births
1806 deaths
19th-century Ottoman military personnel
Bosnian Muslims from the Ottoman Empire
Bosnia and Herzegovina soldiers
Ottoman military personnel killed in action
People of the First Serbian Uprising
Ottoman military personnel of the Serbian Revolution
People from Bihać
Ottoman Bosnian nobility